John L. Arnett is a Canadian psychologist whose work concerned developing clinical health psychology.

Career
In 1985, Arnett was appointed Head of the Department of Clinical Health Psychology at the University of Manitoba, Winnipeg. This department was designed to expand the remit of psychologists in healthcare beyond mental health into physical health.

Arnett's publications focus on arguing for the need for clinical psychologists to have a wider remit within healthcare.

Publications

 Arnett, J.L. (2001). Clinical and Health Psychology: Future Directions.
 Arnett, J.L. (2006). Psychology and health. 
 Arnett, J.L., Nicholson, I.R., & Breault, L. (2006). Psychology's Role in Health in Canada

Positions
 President, Canadian Psychological Association (2005)
 President, Psychological Association of Manitoba (2012)

Awards
 2000: Award for Distinguished Contribution to Psychology as a Profession, Canadian Psychological Association

References

Canadian psychologists
20th-century Canadian psychologists
Living people
Clinical psychologists
Academic staff of the University of Manitoba
Year of birth missing (living people)
Presidents of the Canadian Psychological Association